Sonny Stevens (born 22 June 1992) is a Dutch professional footballer who plays as a goalkeeper for ADO Den Haag, on loan from OFI. He formerly played for FC Volendam, FC Twente, Go Ahead Eagles and SC Cambuur.

Career
Stevens left SC Cambuur on 30 June 2022 at the expiry of his contract, after failing to agree on extension.

On 10 August 2022, Stevens signed a two-year contract with OFI in Greece.

References

External links
 
 Voetbal International profile 
 Netherlands profile at OnsOranje

Living people
1992 births
People from Hoorn
Footballers from North Holland
Association football goalkeepers
Dutch footballers
Netherlands youth international footballers
FC Volendam players
FC Twente players
Jong FC Twente players
Go Ahead Eagles players
Excelsior Rotterdam players
SC Cambuur players
OFI Crete F.C. players
ADO Den Haag players
Eredivisie players
Eerste Divisie players
Super League Greece players
Dutch expatriate footballers
Expatriate footballers in Greece
Dutch expatriate sportspeople in Greece